Darrel Chandra Raja Collure (3 June 1938 – 7 December 2021) was a Sri Lankan politician who served as Governor of the Uva Province and Governor of the North Western Province until his death in 2021.

Biography
He was a member of the Communist Party of Sri Lanka and a former member of the Sri Lanka Parliament.

Collure died from COVID-19 on 7 December 2021, at the age of 83.

References

1938 births
2021 deaths
Communist Party of Sri Lanka politicians
Governors of Uva Province
Members of the 11th Parliament of Sri Lanka
Members of the 12th Parliament of Sri Lanka
People's Alliance (Sri Lanka) politicians
Sinhalese politicians
Deaths from the COVID-19 pandemic in Sri Lanka